Chituru Ethan Odunze (born October 14, 2002) is an American professional soccer player who plays as a goalkeeper for Leicester City.

Club career
Born in Raleigh, North Carolina, Odunze moved to England as a child and played for local youth teams before spending time in the Chelsea academy. He moved to Canada when he was eleven and played for local sides Calgary Villains and Calgary Blizzard. During this time, he went on trial with Welsh side Cardiff City, training with the first team despite only being fourteen.

In January 2019, he joined the Vancouver Whitecaps from Calgary Foothills.

In 2019, Odunze signed with English side Leicester City. He has since trained with the senior squad.

Personal life
Chituru is of Igbo Nigerian descent.

International career
Odunze is eligible for the United States, England, Canada, and Nigeria. He was called up to the Canada under-15 side in 2017 but has represented the United States at under-17 and under-20 levels. He represented the United States at the 2019 FIFA U-17 World Cup, playing in two group-stage games.

In November 2020, Odunze was called up to the senior United States national team for the first time.

References

External links
 

2002 births
Living people
Soccer players from North Carolina
Soccer players from Raleigh, North Carolina
American soccer players
United States men's youth international soccer players
Association football goalkeepers
Chelsea F.C. players
Calgary Foothills FC players
Vancouver Whitecaps FC players
Leicester City F.C. players
American expatriate soccer players
Expatriate soccer players in Canada
Expatriate footballers in England
American expatriate sportspeople in Canada
American expatriate sportspeople in England
American sportspeople of Nigerian descent
United States men's under-20 international soccer players